Women & Songs 6 is the sixth album in the Women & Songs franchise.

Overview
The album was released on December 3, 2002.  This turned out to be, as of January 2009, the biggest Women & Songs album in terms of number of tracks, comprising 21 tracks in total.

The album reached #7 on the Top Canadian Albums chart.  This was down from the #5 showing two years earlier, and a drop of 5 spots since the 1998 peak of the second album at #2.

Track listing
 "A Thousand Miles" (Vanessa Carlton) [3:57]
(performed by Vanessa Carlton)
 "Soak Up the Sun" (Sheryl Crow/Jeff Trott) [3:26]
(performed by Sheryl Crow)
 "Standing Still" (Jewel Kilcher) [4:30]
(performed by Jewel)
 "Hands Clean" (Alanis Morissette) [3:52]
(performed by Alanis Morissette)
 "Blackbird" (John Lennon/Paul McCartney) [2:21]
(performed by Sarah McLachlan)
 "Don't Know Why" (Jesse Harris) [3:05]
(performed by Norah Jones)
 "Goodbye to You" (Michelle Branch) [3:52]
(performed by Michelle Branch)
 "Sweet Ones" (Sarah Slean) [3:13]
(performed by Sarah Slean)
 "What It Feels Like for a Girl" (Madonna/Guy Sigsworth) [4:02]
(performed by Madonna)
 "Beautiful Blue" (Holly McNarland) [4:29]
(performed by Holly McNarland)
 "Sometimes Wanna Die" (Thomas Payne) [3:08]
(performed by Joydrop)
 "Full Moon" (Mike City) [3:59]
(performed by Brandy)
 "The Look of Love" (Burt Bacharach/Hal David) [4:41]
(performed by Diana Krall)
 "Baby Can I Hold You" (Tracy Chapman) [3:13]
(performed by Tracy Chapman)
 "Never Mind" (Jann Arden Richards) [3:31]
(performed by Jann Arden)
 "Day by Day" (S. Carream/E. Provencher) [3:56]
(performed by Bet.e And Stef)
 "Still Desire You" (Melanie Doane/Rick Neigher) [4:07]
(performed by Melanie Doane)
 "My Oh My" (Molly Johnson/Steven MacKinnon) [3:51]
(performed by Molly Johnson)
 "Bonnie and Clyde II" (Martina Sorbara) [3:45]
(performed by Martina Sorbara)
 "Miracle (Dayna Manning song)" (E. Bazilian/Dayna Manning) [3:26]
(performed by Dayna Manning)
 "The Streets Where You Live" (Gary Durban/John Ellis/Wyckham Porteous) [4:11]
(performed by Buried Heart Project)

References
 [ Women & Songs 6 at AllMusic]

2002 compilation albums